The Southern Railway (SR) gave the designation 2-BIL to the DC third rail electric multiple units built during the 1930s to work long-distance semi-fast services on the newly electrified lines from London to Eastbourne, Portsmouth and Reading. This type of unit survived long enough in British Rail ownership to be allocated TOPS Class 401.

Construction
The 2-BIL units (2-car Bi-Lavatory stock) were so-called because each set had two lavatories, one in each car. They were built in four batches, each for service on newly electrified lines:

The different batches were broadly similar, though in the first one, the driving motor brake car had a smaller brake compartment and seven full compartments, rather than six-and-a-half in the later batches.

Several of the cars were destroyed in World War II at various points on the system. Some unit numbers were withdrawn, while others received a single replacement car from the small batch of postwar all-steel 2-HAL units which were built as replacements.

Formations
The first two batches of 2-BIL stock were subject to the EMU renumbering scheme implemented during January and February 1937. The renumbering of these units, and the original formations of all 2-BIL units, are set out in the table below (*Unit 1890 was renumbered 1900 in January 1936):

The first ten 2-BIL units (2001 to 2010) had an earlier form of multiple unit control. They were compatible with the 4-LAV units of the same era, but not with the remainder of the 2-BIL sets. They normally operating from Brighton, where the 4-LAV were also based, on local services. The remaining sets spent their lives on the services for which they were constructed, although they were fully mixed in operation, and it was common for units to be exchanged between areas of operation even within a day's normal work. Commuter services into London Waterloo, Victoria and London Bridge found them typically marshalled up to 8-car units.

An unusual feature of their operation in the 1950s and 1960s was that there were about 30 more diagrams for these units than sets actually existed, while for the subsequent 2-HAL units (Class 402) there were more than 30 spare units, so a significant number of the daily 2-BIL diagrams were operated by the latter units, typically marshalled together as one of the sets in a full 8-car formation.

7TC
In 1963, a 7-coach trailer set was formed by placing five former 4-SUB trailer cars between the two driving cars from unit 2006. The set was intended for use on the Oxted line, where it was hauled by diesel locomotives.

The motors from former DMBS car number 10573 were removed, and the whole set was re-wired to enable the hauling diesel locomotive to provide the electric train heating. Six out of nine compartments of one of the 4-Sub Trailer Second cars (number 11485) were refitted as first class compartments, thereby making it a Trailer Composite.

The set was originally numbered 900 in the old hauled carriage set number series, but this was amended in February 1966 to 701 in the new series for trailer control units. Despite this, and its designation as 7-TC (7-car Trailer Control stock), it was not a real trailer control unit in that a locomotive could not be operated remotely from the unit's driving cars.

The unit was stored from December 1967 and then withdrawn in April 1969. However, while the two driving cars were scrapped the following year, all five trailers were reused in other units. Four returned to 4-SUB formations, but 11485 underwent a further conversion, this time to a 4EPB Trailer Second, and was renumbered 15084. Full details of the 7-TC formation, the origin of the individual cars and their subsequent disposal are set out in the table below:

Accidents and incidents
Thirty-eight people were injured.

Withdrawal
After withdrawal in 1971, various 2-BIL units in company with 2-HAL units were noted at Stratford in east London destined for scrapping by Kings of Norwich, or being hauled west for scrapping in the Newport area.

Preservation
Only one 2-BIL unit has survived into preservation, namely number 2090, formed of carriages 10656 and 12123, which is in the care of the National Railway Museum, York. This unit is also one of only two pre-war main line EMUs in existence, which are still in original formation. The other is the Class 503, which is kept at the Locomotive Storage Ltd facility in Margate.

Notes

References

Sources

Further reading

External links

Southern Electric Group - Details of class designation.

2BIL
401
Train-related introductions in 1935
750 V DC multiple units